Louis George Martin (11 November 1936 – 16 January 2015) was a British middle-heavyweight weightlifter.

Biography
Martin was born in Kingston, Jamaica, where he did some bodybuilding. In the mid-1950s he moved to the United Kingdom and started training in weightlifting.

At the 1958 Commonwealth Games he still represented Jamaica, but the next year he won a world title while competing for Great Britain. At the Summer Olympics, he won a bronze medal in 1960 and a silver medal in 1964; he failed in the last (clean and jerk) event in 1968. Between 1959 and 1965 he won four world and four European titles and set four world records, though only two became official.

He represented England and won a gold medal in the middle heavyweight division, at the 1962 British Empire and Commonwealth Games in Perth, Western Australia.

He went on to secure three consecutive gold medals at the Commonwealth Games, winning the gold in the middle heavyweight division at both the 1966 British Empire and Commonwealth Games in Kingston, Jamaica and the 1970 British Commonwealth Games in Edinburgh, Scotland.

In 2018, Martin was one of the first people to be commemorated by a plaque on Derby's walk of fame.

References

1936 births
2015 deaths
Sportspeople from Kingston, Jamaica
Jamaican male weightlifters
British male weightlifters
Commonwealth Games competitors for Jamaica
Weightlifters at the 1958 British Empire and Commonwealth Games
Commonwealth Games gold medallists for England
Weightlifters at the 1962 British Empire and Commonwealth Games
Weightlifters at the 1966 British Empire and Commonwealth Games
Weightlifters at the 1970 British Commonwealth Games
Olympic weightlifters of Great Britain
Olympic silver medallists for Great Britain
Olympic bronze medallists for Great Britain
Weightlifters at the 1960 Summer Olympics
Weightlifters at the 1964 Summer Olympics
Weightlifters at the 1968 Summer Olympics
Olympic medalists in weightlifting
Migrants from British Jamaica to the United Kingdom
Medalists at the 1964 Summer Olympics
Medalists at the 1960 Summer Olympics
Commonwealth Games medallists in weightlifting
Medallists at the 1962 British Empire and Commonwealth Games
Medallists at the 1966 British Empire and Commonwealth Games
Medallists at the 1970 British Commonwealth Games